The Stavropegial Institutions are churches, monastic communities, and theological schools which are stauropegions of the Orthodox Church in America, meaning they are under the direct supervision of the Orthodox Church in America's primate. The Stavropegial Institutions are located in three states in the United States and one Canadian province – California, New York, Ontario, and Pennsylvania.

Notable Stavropegial Institutions 
 Saint Tikhon's Orthodox Theological Seminary – South Canaan Township, Pennsylvania
 Saint Vladimir's Orthodox Theological Seminary – Crestwood, New York
 New Skete
 Companions of New Skete, Cambridge, NY
 Monks of New Skete, Cambridge, NY
 Nuns of New Skete, Cambridge, NY
 Three Hierarchs Chapel, Crestwood, NY
 Holy Myrrhbearer's Monastery, Otego, NY
 St. Sergius of Radonezh, Oyster Bay Cove, NY
 St. Tikhon of Zadonsk Monastery, South Canaan, PA
 Protection of the Most Holy Theotokos Monastery, Weaverville

See also
 Stauropegic

External links
 Listing on oca.org

Stavropegial
Eastern Orthodoxy in California
Eastern Orthodoxy in New York (state)
Eastern Orthodoxy in Pennsylvania
Christianity in Ontario
Eastern Orthodoxy in Canada